Ptyopterota is a monotypic moth genus of the family Noctuidae. Its only species, Ptyopterota obscura, is found in Myanmar. Both the genus and species were first described by George Hampson in 1894.

References

Acontiinae
Monotypic moth genera